Copy number analysis is the process of analyzing data produced by a test for DNA copy number variation in an organism's sample. One application of such analysis is the detection of chromosomal copy number variation that may cause or may increase risks of various critical disorders. Copy number variation can be detected with various types of tests such as fluorescent in situ hybridization, comparative genomic hybridization and with high-resolution array-based tests based on array comparative genomic hybridization (or aCGH), SNP array technologies and high resolution microarrays that include copy number probes as well an SNPs. Array-based methods have been accepted as the most efficient in terms of their resolution and high-throughput nature and the highest coverage (choose an array with over 2 million probes) and they are also referred to as virtual karyotype. Data analysis for an array-based DNA copy number test can be very challenging though due to very high volume of data that come out of an array platform. 

BAC (Bacterial Artificial Chromosome) arrays were historically the first microarray platform to be used for DNA copy number analysis. This platform is used to identify gross deletions or amplifications in DNA. Such anomalies for example are common in cancer and can be used for diagnosis of many developmental disorders. Data produced by such platforms are usually low to medium resolution in terms of genome coverage. Usually, log-ratio measurements are produced by this technology to represent deviation of patient's copy number state from normal. Such measurements then are studied and those that significantly differ from zero value are announced to represent a part of a chromosome with an anomaly (an abnormal copy number state). Positive log-ratios indicate a region of DNA copy number gain and negative log-ratio values mark a region of DNA copy number loss. Even a single data point can be declared an indication of a copy number gain or a copy number loss in BAC arrays.

See also
Bioinformatics
DNA microarray

References

Genetics
Molecular biology